Jackdaw gas field is a large offshore natural gas field which lies in the North Sea, 150 miles east of Aberdeen. It is wholly owned by BG International Limited, which has been a part of the Shell Group companies since 2016.

References 

Natural gas fields in the United Kingdom
North Sea energy
Shell plc oil and gas fields